Clé 1: Miroh (stylized as Clé 1 : MIROH) is the fourth extended play by South Korean boy group Stray Kids. The EP was released digitally and physically on March 25, 2019, by JYP Entertainment and distributed through Iriver. The release of the EP was in conjunction with the first anniversary of the group's debut.

It is with the single "Miroh" that Stray Kids obtained their first win on the music show M Countdown.

Promotion 
To promote the release of the EP, JYP Entertainment announced on March 7 that the group would travel around South Korea to meet with fans, titled "Hi-Stay Tour in Korea". The group visited Busan, Daejeon, and Incheon prior to the album's release, and followed it with a special event in Seoul on April 4.

Track listing

Charts

Weekly charts

Year-end charts

Certifications

Accolades

Notes

References 

2019 EPs
JYP Entertainment EPs
Korean-language EPs
Stray Kids EPs
IRiver EPs